Sverre Rotevatn (born 17 January 1977 in Lillehammer) is a former Norwegian nordic combined who competed from 1998 to 2004. He won a gold medal in the 4 x 5 km team event at the 2001 FIS Nordic World Ski Championships in Lahti and finished 27th in the 15 km individual event at those same championships.

Rotevatn's best individual finish at the Winter Olympics was 7th in the 7.5 km sprint event at Salt Lake City in 2002. His best individual career finish was 2nd on five occasions from 1998 to 2003.

External links 

1977 births
Living people
People from Rana, Norway
Norwegian male Nordic combined skiers
Nordic combined skiers at the 2002 Winter Olympics
Olympic Nordic combined skiers of Norway
FIS Nordic World Ski Championships medalists in Nordic combined
Sportspeople from Nordland
21st-century Norwegian people